Bibi Janabad (also Romanized as Bībī Jānābād; also known as Bābā’ī, Bābā’ī Jānābād, and Jānābād) is a village in Emamzadeh Jafar Rural District, in the Central District of Gachsaran County, Kohgiluyeh and Boyer-Ahmad Province, Iran. At the 2006 census, its population was 928, in 197 families.

References 

Populated places in Gachsaran County